Godovič ( or) is a settlement in the hills southeast of Idrija in the traditional Inner Carniola region of Slovenia.

Geography
Godovič includes several hamlets and isolated farms: Šebalk, Andrejač, and Dol to the south; Česnik, Gabrovšek, Zala, and Brda to the west; Log, Anžič, Menart, and Lenart to the north; and Ivanje Doline (in older sources Ivanja Dolina) and Cesar to the east.

Name
Godovič was attested in historical sources as Godawitz in 1450. The name Godovič is based on a personal name with the root *god- (e.g., *Godislavъ, *Godimirъ, etc.), probably referring to something good or favorable. It is related to place names such as Godič, Godemarci, and Godeninci. Locally, the name of the settlement has a mobile accent, pronounced , genitive .

Attractions

Near Godovič there are fossilized dinosaur footprints. There are the remnants of a First World War military narrow-gauge railway known as the Feldban and an unfinished railroad tunnel from 1917. There are also examples of the snake-branch Norway spruce (Picea abies 'Virgata'), a rare variety of spruce.

Church

The parish church in the settlement is dedicated to Saint Urban and belongs to the Diocese of Koper.

Notable people
Marcos Luis Jerman (born 1957), artist and Olympic athlete
Matevž Govekar (born 2000), racing cyclist for Team Bahrain Victorious
Vinko Kobal (1928–2001), priest and translator

See also 
 Godovič Pass

References

External links

Godovič on Geopedia

Populated places in the Municipality of Idrija